Special elections to the San Diego City Council are called by the San Diego City Council when a vacancy arises on the Council with more than one year remaining in the term. Most special elections are conducted in two rounds. The first is an open primary and the candidate with the most votes must have a majority of the votes plus one to win the seat. If no candidate wins a majority a second round is held with the two top candidates regardless of party.

List of special elections
The dates listed only include the open primary round if no second round was held.

List of recall elections 
When applicable, the candidate who succeeded the recalled council member is listed. If the recall election was not successful the winner is listed as "none".

Results

2001 District 8 special election

2001 District 6 special election

2004–2005 District 4 special election
Charles L. Lewis died in office while under federal indictment on charges of bribery and corruption as a result of the FBI investigation known as Operation G-Sting. Tony Young, previously Lewis' chief of staff, ran in the special election to replace him. Young advanced to the runoff after receiving the second most votes in the special primary election on November 16, 2004. He went on to win election by receiving the majority of votes in the special runoff election on January 4, 2005.

2005–2006 District 2 special election
Michael Zucchet resigned from office in July 2005 when he was convicted of corruption as a result of the FBI investigation known as Operation G-Sting, though he was later cleared of all charges. Kevin Faulconer, who had been the runner-up in the 2002 election against Zucchet, ran again in the crowded special election. He received the most votes in the primary election on November 8, 2005, and was elected with a majority of the votes in the runoff on January 10, 2006.

2005–2006 District 8 special election
Ralph Inzunza resigned from office in July 2005 when he was convicted of corruption as a result of the FBI investigation known as Operation G-Sting. Ben Hueso ran in the special election to replace Inzunza. He advanced to the special runoff election after receiving the plurality of the votes in the special primary on November 8, 2005. Hueso was elected to office with a majority of the votes in the runoff on January 10, 2006.

2013 District 4 special election
On November 17, 2012, Council President Tony Young announced that he would resign from the City Council early to become CEO of the San Diego-Imperial Counties chapter of the American Red Cross, triggering a special election. Nine candidates qualified for the special primary election, scheduled for March 26, 2013. Myrtle Cole, who had been endorsed by the local Democratic Party and the San Diego-Imperial Counties Labor Council, received the most votes in the primary. She advanced to the May 21, 2013 general election to face runner-up Dwayne Crenshaw, Executive Director of San Diego LGBT Pride. Cole was elected to the City Council with a majority of the votes in the runoff.

References 

San Diego City Council elections
elections